A Time to Love is the twenty-third and most recent studio album by Stevie Wonder, his first since Conversation Peace in 1995. Originally to have been completed in 2004, it was finally released to stores on October 18, 2005, following an exclusive digital release on Apple's iTunes Music Store on September 27.

The first single, issued in April 2005, was "So What the Fuss", which featured Prince on guitar and En Vogue on backing vocals. Follow-up singles included "Positivity" with his daughter Aisha Morris, "From the Bottom of My Heart" and "Shelter in the Rain".

The song "Shelter in the Rain" was in tribute to his first wife, the singer Syreeta Wright, who died of cancer the year before this album was released. Wonder was quoted as saying he would have had Wright singing lead on it had she lived.

Reception

The album was received with generally positive reviews, despite its having been delayed several times during the year of its release. In 2005, Wonder won the Best Male Pop Vocal Performance in the Grammy Awards  for "From the Bottom of My Heart". This was his fourth win in this category. Wonder last won this award 29 years earlier in 1976 for Songs in the Key of Life. His other wins in this category were in 1973 ("You Are the Sunshine of My Life") and 1974 (Fulfillingness First Finale).

Track listing

Personnel

Music 

 Thomassina Atkins – choir/chorus
 Francis Awe – talking drum
 Kimberly Brewer – background vocals
 Shirley Brewer – background vocals
 Kim Burrell – primary vocals
 Teddy Campbell – drums
 Mabvuto Carpenter – background vocals
 Jherimi Leigh Carter – choir/chorus
 Wendell Kelly – trombone
 Oscar Castro-Neves – guitar
 Ayrianna Cerant – choir/chorus
 Swapan Chaudhuri – tabla
 Gregory Curtis – background vocals
 Monique DeBarge – background vocals
 DeVere Duckett – background vocals
 Nathan East – bass guitar
 Kevon Edmonds – background vocals
 Lynne Fiddmont – background vocals
 Brianna Ford – choir/chorus
 Doug E. Fresh – beat box
 Patrick Gandy – conductor, orchestration
 Richie Gajate Garcia – congas/hand percussion
 Tony Gates – choir/chorus
 Daronn Gooden – choir/chorus
 Timothy Hall – choir/chorus
 Kenya Hathaway – background vocals
 India.Arie – composer, primary artist
 Herman Jackson – bells, keyboard
 Phillip "Taj" Jackson – background vocals
 Keith John – background vocals
 Accalra Johnson – choir/chorus
 Desarae Johnson – choir/chorus
 Timothy Jon Johnson – background vocals
 Unique Johnson – choir/chorus
 Chatoya Jones – choir/chorus
 Erica L. King – choir/chorus
 Abbos Kosimov – doira
 Debra Laws – background vocals
 Hubert Laws – flute
 Ricky Lawson – drums
 Paul McCartney – acoustic/electric guitar
 Melody McCully – background vocals
 Brijee McDowell – choir/chorus
 Sebastian Mego – choir/chorus, background vocals
 Kristie Mingo – background vocals
 Aisha Morris – primary artist
 Woody Murray – vibraphone
 Traci Nelson – background vocals
 Morris O'Connor – guitar
 Conesha Owens – background vocals
 Greg Phillinganes – electric piano
 Mike Phillips – saxophone
 Doc Powell – guitar
 Prince – guitar
 Bryan Sledge – choir/chorus
 Amir Sofi – darbouka
 Lamont Van Hook – background vocals
 Nathan Watts – bass
 Andy Weiner – conductor, orchestration, string arrangements
 Willie Wheaton, Jr. – background vocals
 Fred White – background vocals
 Johneisha White – choir/chorus
 Tamiko Whitsett – background vocals
 Barbara Wilson – background vocals
 Sherman B. Wilson – choir/chorus
 LaLynda Winfield – choir/chorus
 LaShanea Winfield – choir/chorus
 LaShanique Winfield – choir/chorus
 Stevie Wonder – arranger, art conception, audio production, bass, bells, bongos, chimes, clapping, clavinet, composer, drawing, drum loop, drums, editing, Fender Rhodes, finger cymbals, flexatones, flute arrangement, guitar loops, hand percussion, harmonica, keyboard guitar, keyboards, marimba, Moog bass, organ, percussion, piano, piano (electric), primary artist, producer, programming, rhythm section, sequencing arranger, string arrangements, synthesizer bass, tambourine, vocal arrangement, vocals (background), voice box

Production 

 Gary Adante – engineer
 Stephanie Andrews – art conception, project coordinator
 Robert A. Arbittier – digital editing, editing, overdubs, programming
 David Blumberg – arranger
 Barry G. Clark – technical support
 Jeffrey Coprich – leader
 Tom Corwin – engineer, producer
 Scott Elgin – assistant
 Aaron Fessel – engineer
 Ernie Fields Jr. – contractor
 Kirk Franklin – arranger, producer
 Brian Gardner – mastering
 Evren Göknar – assistant
 John Holino – technical support
 Femi Jiya – engineer, mixing
 Steve Jones – programming
 Jim Keller – assistant
 Chris Kornmann – creative director
 Nick Marshall – assistant
 Rickey Minor – orchestra supervision, string arrangements
 Bobby Montez – assistant
 Scott Moore – assistant
 Francesco Perlangeli – assistant
 Neil Pogue – mixing
 Joel Poinsett – assistant
 Josean Posey – engineer
 Bonnie Raitt – producer
 Dave Reitzas – engineer
 Paul Riser – arranger
 Anthony Ruotolo – engineer
 Rafa Sardina – engineer
 Christine Sirois – assistant
 Ralph Sutton – engineer
 Heratch Touresian – programming
 Gregory Upshaw – wardrobe
 Peter Vargo – assistant
 Donnie Whittmore – assistant
 Val Williams – make-up
 Eddie Wolfl – photography

Charts

Certifications

References

External links
 Stevie Wonder interview with Newsweek, in which he discusses the album

2005 albums
Albums produced by Stevie Wonder
Motown albums
Stevie Wonder albums